Ankeny High School is a public high school located in Ankeny, Iowa, United States.  It is part of the Ankeny Community School District, and serves grades 10 through 12.

History
AHS opened in 1913 and graduated six seniors in the spring of 1914.
In August 2011, the school moved to a new location, which was built at a construction cost of about $54 million. Construction began on the new location in 2008 after planning concluded. Ankeny Centennial High School opened in 2013, drawing students from what was the northern portion of AHS' attendance zone. A new $25 million addition was announced in 2020.

Athletics
AHS athletic teams are classified as 4A by the Iowa High School Athletic Association and compete in the Central Iowa Metro League. 
In 2005, the girls' basketball team rose as high as No. 2 in USA Today's Super 25 national rankings.

Fine arts
Ankeny has three competitive show choirs, the mixed-gender "Visual Adrenaline" and "Perpetual Motion" as well as the all-female "Intensity". With the opening of Ankeny Centennial in 2013, some inside the show choir program wanted to end the history of the three groups and start fresh with new directors and new names. The Ankeny Community School District cited a 2009 precedent in a 2011 move to disallow any potential attempted name changes. Visual Adrenaline has won national-level competitions before.

Notable alumni
 Dennis Albaugh, businessman
 Dennis Gibson, football player
 Pat Dunsmore, football player
 Paul Rhoads, football coach
 Benj Sampson, baseball player
 Todd Sears, baseball player
 Colton Smith, wrestler and martial artist 
 Matthew Whitaker, attorney
 Connie Yori, basketball coach

See also
List of high schools in Iowa

References

External links

Schools in Polk County, Iowa
Public high schools in Iowa
Ankeny, Iowa
1913 establishments in Iowa
Educational institutions established in 1913